The Bharatiya Janata Party, or simply,  BJP Nagaland (BJP;), 
is the state unit of the Bharatiya Janata Party of the Nagaland. Its head office is situated at the 1st Floor, Aiko Building, Opp. Town Hall, Bank Colony, Dimapur, 797112, Nagaland, India. The current president of BJP Nagaland is Temjen Imna Along.

History

Lok Sabha members
There are no Lok Sabha Members from BJP at Nagaland

Rajya Sabha members

In General Election

In State Election

See also
Bharatiya Janata Party
National Democratic Alliance
North East Democratic Alliance 
Naga People's Front 
Nationalist Democratic Progressive Party 
United Democratic Alliance

References

Nagaland
Political parties in Nagaland